Bristol is a census-designated place in Ellis County, Texas, United States. The population was 668 at the 2010 census.

Geography
Bristol is located along Farm to Market Road 660 in northeastern Ellis County, approximately six miles northeast of Palmer and eighteen miles northeast of Waxahachie. It is part of the Dallas–Fort Worth metroplex.

From highway 660 it connects Bristol to Palmer, and Union Hill Rd connects Bristol to Ennis.

History 
Settlement of the area dates back to the 1840s by Joshua Brock. The community was first called Brockville and a post office operated under that name from 1854 to 1869. The name Brockville was due to Joshua Brock who was the town's first postmaster general. Later, the community was unofficially known as Heelstring. The town itself was located on the banks of the Trinity River. This area is commonly referred to as the, "River Bottoms", by local residents. The town was destroyed by a fire in the late 1800's and relocated to the current location.

Years later, Captain Steven Mills came to the area and opened a store. Having done business in Bristol, England, he named the store Bristol and the community eventually adopted the name. By 1890, Bristol had grown into a farming community of approximately 200 residents. The population peaked at around 300 in the early 1930s and declined thereafter. The community continues to serve as a supply and service center for area farmers and local beef ranches.

In 2010, Bristol was defined as a census-designated place (CDP) by the U.S. Census Bureau. The boundaries include the original community of Bristol and surrounding areas.

Today the community holds several events including the monthly Bristol Opry, 4th of July Celebration, Easter Bunny Breakfast, and Thanksgiving Dinner.

Demographics
At the 2010 United States Census there were 668 people, 239 households, and 188 families residing in the CDP. The racial makeup of the city was 91.2% White (81.4% Non-Hispanic White), 0.4% Native American, 2.8% African American, 0.1% Asian, 4.8% from other races, and 0.6% from two or more races. Hispanic or Latino of any race were 14.8% of the population.

Education
The community’s first school was housed in a multi-purpose building erected here in 1870. The Bristol School district was established in 1877. Youth from throughout the area attended Bristol schoolhouse built in 1886 and 1913. A new brick school containing five classrooms and an impressive auditorium and stage was completed here by the U.S. Works Progress Administration (WPA) in 1939. 130 pupils attended the 9-grade, 6-teacher school in 1940-41. The school served the area until 1955. In 1957 its facilities and grounds were deeded to the Bristol Cemetery Association.

Currently, the Ennis Independent School District, Ferris Independent School District, and Palmer Independent School District each serve portions of the Bristol area.

Cemeteries 
The small town has three cemeteries, the largest and currently used is the Bristol Cemetery located in town and administered by the Bristol Cemetery Association. Two of the older cemeteries is the Hefley Pioneer Cemetery located on Slate Rock Road and Union Hill Cemetery located on Union Hill Road. Union Hill served as a burial spot for Union soldiers during the Civil War. It had not been a burial area for many years until a veteran was buried there in 2007. It left a 50-year gap from when the last stone was laid for the Hogg Family in the 1950s.  Both historical cemeteries are maintained by local volunteers.

References
-The History of Ellis County (Pub. 1970 on the postmaster edit.)

Census-designated places in Ellis County, Texas
Census-designated places in Texas
Dallas–Fort Worth metroplex